Anila Paparisto is an entomologist and taxonomist from Albania, who was appointed in 2021 as Vice Rector for Teaching at the University of Tirana. She is also Professor in Invertebrate Zoology and Teaching Didactics there. Her career began at the university in 1994 and in 2011 was promoted to professor. Her research has focussed on invasive species in Albania, in particular in riverine environments. She is a member of the Academy of Sciences of Albania. She is a board member of the Quality Assurance Agency in Higher Education Board in Albania.

Awards 
In 2002 Paparisto was awarded a fellowship from the L'Oréal-UNESCO For Women in Science Awards for her work in molecular biology.

References 

Year of birth missing (living people)
Living people
Albanian scientists
Women entomologists
Women biologists
Molecular biologists
Academic staff of the University of Tirana
L'Oréal-UNESCO Awards for Women in Science fellows